Edmund T. Rolls is a neuroscientist and Professor at the University of Warwick.

Rolls is a neuroscientist with research interests in computational neuroscience, including the operation of real neuronal networks in the brain involved in vision, memory, attention, and decision-making; functional neuroimaging of vision, taste, olfaction, feeding, the control of appetite, memory, and emotion; neurological disorders of emotion; psychiatric disorders including depression and schizophrenia; and the brain processes underlying consciousness. 

These studies include investigations in patients, and are performed with the aim of contributing to understanding the human brain in health and disease, and of treating its disorders.

Education
Edmund Rolls read preclinical Medicine at the University of Cambridge, and then performed graduate research in neuroscience at the University of Oxford where he was awarded a Doctor of Philosophy (DPhil) degree in 1970. He was awarded a DSc at the University of Oxford in 1986.

Career and Research
Rolls was elected to a Fellowship by Examination at Magdalen College, University of Oxford (1969-1973). Rolls was then Lecturer and later Professor of Experimental Psychology at the University of Oxford (1973–2008). Rolls also served as Fellow and Tutor in Psychology at Corpus Christi College, University of Oxford (1973–2008; and Vice President of Corpus Christi 2003–2006).

In 2008 (–present), Rolls moved to the University of Warwick, where he is Professor of Computational Neuroscience, to perform full-time research.

Rolls was also appointed as a Distinguished Chair Professor, at the Institute of Science and Technology for Brain-Inspired Intelligence at Fudan University, Shanghai (2018–present).

Research Impact

Rolls was ranked in 2019 as the 18th most cited scientist in the UK, and the 150th most cited scientist in the world out of 6,880,389 in any field of science who have published more than 5 papers across every scientific field (i.e. in the top 0.002%) (composite indicator c, Ioannidis et al. 2019 A standardized citation metrics author database annotated for scientific field. PLoS Biol 17(8): e3000384). Rolls was at the same time ranked as the 20th most cited neuroscientist in the world, and 3rd in the UK (composite indicator c for Neurology and Neurosurgery, Ioannidis et al 2019). In 2021, Rolls was ranked by Research.com as the top 20th neuroscientist in the world, and 6th in the UK, based on productivity and citations.  

Rolls has served as a member of the Council, and the Secretary of the Council, of the European Neuroscience Association (now FENS); Secretary of the European Brain and Behaviour Society; and a member of the Fellowships Committee of the Human Frontier Science Program. He also served as Associate Director of the Medical Research Council Interdisciplinary Research Centre for Cognitive Neuroscience at the University of Oxford for 1990–2003, and founding member of the Board of the Oxford McDonnell Centre for Cognitive Neuroscience for 1990–2008. He was awarded the degree of Hon DSc by the Medical University of Toyama, Japan in 2005.

Publications

Selected Papers

 Rolls, E. T. (2019) The orbitofrontal cortex and emotion in health and disease, including depression. Neuropsychologia 128: 14-43.
 Rolls, E. T. (2016). A non-reward attractor theory of depression. Neuroscience and Biobehavioral Reviews 68: 47–58.
 Rolls, E. T. (2016). Reward systems in the brain and nutrition. Annual Review of Nutrition 36: 435–470.
 Kesner, R.P. and Rolls, E.T. (2015). A computational theory of hippocampal function, and tests of the theory: new developments. Neuroscience and Biobehavioral Reviews 48: 92-147.
 Rolls, E.T. (2014). Emotion and Decision-Making Explained: Précis. Cortex 59: 185–193.
 Rolls, E.T. (2012). Invariant visual object and face recognition: neural and computational bases, and a model, VisNet. Frontiers in Computational Neuroscience 6: (35) 1-70.
 Rolls, E.T. and Treves, A. (2011). The neuronal encoding of information in the brain. Progress in Neurobiology 95: 448–490.
 Rolls, E.T. (2008). Emotion, higher order syntactic thoughts, and consciousness. Chapter 4, pp. 131–167 in Frontiers of Consciousness, eds. L.Weiskrantz and M.Davies. Oxford University Press: Oxford.
 Rolls, E.T., Loh, M., Deco, G. and Winterer, G. (2008). Computational models of schizophrenia and dopamine modulation in the prefrontal cortex. Nature Reviews Neuroscience'''', 9, 696–709.

Selected books

 Rolls, Edmund T. (2021). Brain Computations: What and How. Oxford University Press (OUP)
 Rolls, Edmund T. (2019). The Orbitofrontal Cortex. (OUP)

 Rolls, Edmund T. (2018). The Brain, Emotion, and Depression. (OUP)
 Rolls, Edmund T. (2016). Cerebral Cortex: Principles of Operation. (OUP)
 Rolls, Edmund T. (2014). Emotion and Decision-Making Explained. (OUP)
 Rolls, Edmund T. (2012). Neuroculture: On the Implications of Brain Science. (OUP)
 Rolls, Edmund T. and Deco, G. (2010). The Noisy Brain: Stochastic Dynamics as a Principle of Brain Function. (OUP)
 Rolls, Edmund T. (2008). Memory, Attention, and Decision-Making: A unifying computational neuroscience approach. (OUP)
 Rolls, Edmund T. and Treves, A. (1998). Neural Networks and Brain Function. (OUP)

References

British neuroscientists
British psychologists
Living people
Fellows of Corpus Christi College, Oxford
Academics of the University of Warwick
Year of birth missing (living people)